The Saint Vincent and the Grenadines Chess Championship is the annual individual chess championship of Saint Vincent and the Grenadines.  The inaugural Tyrone Jack Memorial Open National Chess Championships was held on 17 December 2021. Chinedu Benjamin Enemchukwu finished first in a tournament field of six players to become the first national champion.

Results

Results

Results

Results

References

Chess national championships
Chess in Saint Vincent and the Grenadines
2021 in chess
Recurring sporting events established in 2021
2021 establishments in Saint Vincent and the Grenadines